Turkish Grand Prix can refer to:

Turkish Grand Prix, a Formula One motor race
Turkish motorcycle Grand Prix